Newmarket Public Library may refer to:

Newmarket Public Library (Newmarket, Ontario)
Newmarket Public Library (Newmarket, New Hampshire)